Nukian (also Romanized as Nūkīān, Nowkeyān, and Now Kīān; also known as Nekan and Neyūkān) is a village in Darram Rural District, in the Central District of Tarom County, Zanjan Province, Iran. At the 2006 census, its population was 81, in 27 families.

References 

Populated places in Tarom County